Neith crater is a crater on Jupiter's moon Ganymede, the largest moon in the solar system.

Impact features like Neith have been called "penepalimpsests" by some investigators or "dome craters" by others and are considered to be transitional between craters and palimpsests. Palimpsests are bright, nearly circular patches that are believed to be remnant impact features. They occur also on Callisto, Ganymede's neighbor farther distant from Jupiter.

The most striking feature in Neith is a large, circular dome about 45 km in diameter. The dome is surrounded by a wreath of rugged terrain. The wreath does not represent the original crater rim but the rim of a large central pit instead. The rim itself is barely visible and is located along the outer boundary of a relatively smooth, circular area, assumed to be the crater floor, which in turn surrounds the wreath of rugged terrain. In some parts along the rim, inward-facing scarps may be seen. The rim is not circular but appears to be petal-shaped. Outside the rim, a continuous ejecta blanket may be discerned.

The morphology of impact features such as Neith results either from the response of a relatively weak target material to a high-energy impact or from long-term viscous relaxation of the surface subsequent to impact.

Absolute ages derived from crater frequency measurements are model-dependent. In one crater chronology model, based on impacts dominated by asteroids, Neith may be old and very likely was formed during a period of more intense bombardment than today, about 3.9 billion years ago. In a different model, based on impacts preferentially by comets with a more or less constant impact rate, Neith may be only about 1 billion years old.

References

Impact craters on Ganymede (moon)